The UCI Cyclo-cross World Championships – Women's Juniors Cyclo-cross is the annual world championship for in the discipline of cyclo-cross for women in the Junior category, organised by the world governing body, the Union Cycliste Internationale. The event was first run in 2020. The winner has the right to wear the rainbow jersey for a full year when competing in Juniors cyclo-cross events.

Palmares

Medal count by country

References
 https://www.uci.org/cyclo-cross/events/uci-cyclo-cross-world-championships 

UCI Cyclo-cross World Championships